Restons groupés  is a 1998 French comedy film by Jean-Paul Salomé, starring Emma de Caunes, Samuel Le Bihan, Bruno Solo, Bernard Le Coq, and Estelle Larrivaz.

Cast 
 Emma de Caunes as Claire
 Samuel Le Bihan as Mathias
 Bruno Solo as Jeff
 Bernard Le Coq as Jean-Michel
 Estelle Larrivaz as Suzy
 Judith Henry as Elvira
 Hubert Koundé as Aimé
 Bruno Lochet as Gwenaël
 Antoinette Moya as Lyliane
 Claire Nadeau as Nicole
 Michel Robin as Raymond
 Jorge Cervera Jr. as Emilio
 Vincent Schiavelli as Gary
 Debra Christofferson as Kathy
 Abbes Zahmani as Max

References

External links 
 

1998 films
1990s French-language films
1998 comedy films
Films set in the United States
French comedy films
Films directed by Jean-Paul Salomé
1990s French films